Savage River may refer to:


Places

Australia
Savage River (Tasmania), a tributary of the Pieman River
Savage River, Tasmania, a town in northwestern Tasmania
Savage River National Park, in Tasmania

United States
Savage River (Maryland), a tributary of the Potomac River
Savage River Reservoir
Savage River State Forest, in Maryland

Other uses
 Savage River (TV series), a 2022 Australian television drama series